Yevhen Serhiyovych Yefremov (born 17 January 1994) is a Ukrainian professional footballer who plays as a right-back for FA Šiauliai.

Career
Yevfremov was born in Donetsk. Yefremov is a product of the FC Shakhtar youth sportive school.

In July 2015 he signed a contract with the Ukrainian First League club FC Illichivets Mariupol.

References

External links
 
 
 
 Profile at guldfemman.se

1994 births
Living people
Footballers from Donetsk
Ukrainian footballers
Ukraine youth international footballers
Association football defenders
FC Shakhtar Donetsk players
FC Mariupol players
Härnösands FF players
Kramfors-Alliansen Fotboll players
FC Obolon-Brovar Kyiv players
FC Kolos Kovalivka players
FK Sūduva Marijampolė players
FC Mynai players
Ukrainian Premier League players
Ukrainian First League players
Division 2 (Swedish football) players
A Lyga players
Ukrainian expatriate footballers
Expatriate footballers in Sweden
Ukrainian expatriate sportspeople in Sweden
Expatriate footballers in Lithuania
Ukrainian expatriate sportspeople in Lithuania